Thanasis Kaproulias is an audio artist who creates noise music under the name of Novi_sad.

Life and work

Thanasis Kaproulias was born in Greece in 1980. He graduated from the Economic University of Piraues and lives and works in Athens, Greece.

Thanasis Kaproulias (as "Novi_sad") has worked and collaborated with: Helge Sten (Deathprod, Supersilent), Francisco López, Mika Vainio (Pan Sonic), B. J. Nilsen, Daniel Menche, Zbigniew Karkowski, Richard Chartier, Carl Michael von Hausswolff, Jacob Kirkegaard, Beckie Foon and Scott Konzelmann.

Influenced by the pioneers of audio assault, he began generating sounds in 2005.  In his works, amplified environmental recordings, drone manipulations, structured ambient soundscapes, microtones vs overtones, all come together in a hyperstructure of iconoclastic form.

Novi_sad’s artistic output displays a high level of technical ability, as well as a sensitivity to the nuances of location. Every sound that occurs is treated with a sculptural integrity and his sonic power operates on a level in which the audience participates as transcendental listeners.

His approach is similar to the 'cinema pour l'oreille' (cinema for the ear) and in turn would like to ‘donner à voir’ (lead to seeing) by means of sound.

Novi_sad explores sound as sensation pulling apart its physical properties to reveal its relationship with human perception. Some of his projects are primarily focused in architectural acoustics and the relationship between architecture and sound, when other projects are based on various methods of audio analysis in extremely unusual recordings and the use of quantitative and numerical data from different sources. 

Thanasis Kaproulias is published by Touch Music.

Novi_sad’s albums are available from Sedimental [U.S], Touch [U.K] and Staalplaat [NL]. He has performed his work live in cinemas, industrial spaces, theatres, churches, museums, galleries, squats, in festivals like Mutek [Montreal, Canada], Ultrahung [Budapest, Hungary], Observatori [Valencia, Spain], Gaudeamus Musis Week [Amsterdam, The Netherlands], Field recordings festival [Berlin, Germany], Suoni per il popolo [Montreal, Canada], Full-Pull, [Malmö, Sweden], and in such spaces as VPRO National Radio [Amsterdam, The Netherlands], Diapason Gallery [New York, U.S.A], Royal Danish Academy of Fine Arts [Copenhagen, Denmark], Muziekgebouw aan ‘t IJ [Amsterdam, The Netherlands], Fylkingen [Stockholm, Sweden], The Chapel [Seattle, U.S.A].

Selected festivals and performances
2006
20/03    Polytechnic University, Thessaloniki, GR
2007
25/02    Trianon Filmcenter, Athens, GR
25/03    Ultrahung Festival, Budapest, HU
20/05    Videodance Festival, Athens, GR
15/08    Field recordings Festival, Berlin, DE
20/08    Zaa, Berlin, DE
30/11    Lab, Copenhagen, DN
01/12    Theater Terrier, Malmö, SE
04/12    Plex Music Theater, Copenhagen, DN
2008
20/02    VPRO National Radio, Amsterdam, NL
15/03    Silence, aircraft noises and harmonies in pain, Zeppelin, Barcelona, ES
16/05 Hz vs Church at Electromedia Works festival, Athens, GR
20/05    Danish Institute, Athens, GR
22/06    Observatori Festival, Valencia, ES
05/09    Full-Pull Festival, Malmö, SE
18/09    Mir Festival, Athens, GR
2009
23/02    Rex/B92, Belgrade, RS
26/02    Kuda/CK13, Novi Sad, RS
10/03    Silence, aircraft noises and harmonies in pain, SoundLAB, Cologne, DE
21/03    St. Paul’s Anglican Church, Athens, GR
28/05    Mutek Festival, Montreal, CA
10/06    Suoni per il popolo Festival, Montreal, CA
12/06    Non event, Boston, U.S.A
16/06    Diapason Gallery, New York, U.S.A
21/06    Pyramid Atlantic Center, Washington, U.S.A
23/06    Empty Bottle, Chicago, U.S.A
25/06    The Chapel, Seattle, U.S.A
27/06    The Lab, San Francisco, U.S.A
29/06    Someday Lounge, Portland, U.S.A
05/07    The Pines, Montreal, CA
08/09    Muziekgebouw aan ‘t IJ, Gaudeamus Music Week, Amsterdam, NL
09/09    Steim, Amsterdam, NL  
2010
19/02    Hertz Festival, Athens, GR 
22/04    Tronic Disease, Madrid, ES
24/04    Sirens, Royal Danish Academy of Fine Arts, Copenhagen, DK
26/04    Raum 18, Berlin, DE
27/04    Fylkingen, Stockholm, SE
28/04    Cave 12, Geneva, CH
14/07    Olympia International Festival, Ancient Olympia, GR
23/07    Interferenze Festival, Bisaccia, IT
02/09    Fad Festival w / The Erasers, Belo Horizonte, BR
03/09    Fad Festival w / The Erasers, Belo Horizonte, BR
2011
29/01    Sirens, Hertz Festival, Athens, GR
18/02    Media Ruimte, Brussels, BE
21/03    Neuroplanets , Rojo Nova, Rio de Janeiro, BR
26/03    A/V collaborative performance, Rojo Nova, Rio de Janeiro, BR
30/03    Sirens, Cabaret Voltaire, Zurich, CH
31/03    Skuc Gallery, Irzu, Ljubljana, SI
02/04    Sirens, Rex/B92, Belgrade, RS
15/04    Sirens, Störung Festival, Barcelona, ES
2012
10/04    MUTEK, Guadalajara, MX 
Residencies             
11/07     Mamori art Lab, Amazon, BR
09/08     Center for Composers, Gotland, SE
03/11     Rojo Nova, Rio de Janeiro, BR
Projects      
03/07 ‘Silence, aircraft noises and harmonies in pain’
11/07 ‘Amazon vs Electricity’
04/08 ‘Hz vs Church’
02/09 ‘Sirens’
Sound design        
01/10 ‘Red Book’ video, WWF Greece
04/10 Short movie ‘Casus Belli’, Greece
Participation at the 67th Venice International Film Festival, Italy
Releases                 
01/07 Everything looks better beside water, Format : mp3 / Label : Desetxea ( ES )
03/07 Misguided heart pulses, a hammer, she and the clock, Format : cd  /  Label : S/R limited edition  
03/08 Dramazon, Format : mp3 / Label : Touch ( U.K )
11/08 Jailbirds, Format : cd / Label : Sedimental ( U.S )
11/09 Mort Aux Vaches, Format : cd / Label : Staalplaat ( NL )
01/11 Inhumane Humans, Format : cd / Label : Sub Rosa ( BE )                                   
Publications         
01/09 ‘Hz vs Church’ at Fylkingen’s Hz Journal, SE
12/09 ‘On Violence’ at Konteiner/Eleytherotypia, GR

References

External links 
http://www.novi-sad.net
http://novi-sad.net/projects/silence-aircraft-noises-and-harmonies-in-pain/
http://novi-sad.net/projects/amazon-vs-electricity/
http://novi-sad.net/projects/hz-vs-church/
https://web.archive.org/web/20110611135401/http://www.vpro.nl/programma/dwars/artikelen/39391690/

Living people
1980 births
Sound artists
Experimental composers
Noise musicians
Male classical composers
20th-century male musicians